Limnonectes paramacrodon (commonly known as the masked swamp frog) is a species of frog in the family Dicroglossidae.
It is found in Malay Peninsula (Malaysia, Singapore, and southernmost Thailand), Borneo (Brunei, Indonesia, Malaysia), and Natuna Besar.
Its natural habitats are lowland swamp forest areas with small rivers and streams. It is becoming rare due to habitat loss.

Sources

External links
Amphibian and Reptiles of Peninsular Malaysia - Limnonectes paramacrodon

paramacrodon
Fauna of Brunei
Amphibians of Indonesia
Amphibians of Malaysia
Amphibians of Singapore
Amphibians of Thailand
Amphibians of Borneo
Taxonomy articles created by Polbot
Amphibians described in 1966